Terminal Spirit Disease is the third album by Swedish melodic death metal band At the Gates. It was released in 1994 (see 1994 in music) and re-released in 2003 with bonus tracks. It is the first album to feature rhythm guitarist Martin Larsson who replaced Alf Svensson in 1993. The band originally had wanted to record an EP of new material, but their label had insisted on a full-length album. To compromise, the band added several live tracks to pad the overall length.

Background information
Guitarist Anders Björler commented that he couldn't "remember much" from the recording sessions for Terminal Spirit Disease. When compared to at the Gates' older material, Björler felt the tracks "were simpler and more to the point". A violin and cello are featured on the song "And the World Returned", cited as an example of the group's attempt to explore "ideas which were a little different".

Reception

Reviews for Terminal Spirit Disease have been mostly positive. AllMusic's Eduardo Rivadavia awards the album four out of five stars, and claims that, with this album, "At the Gates raised their creative stakes beyond most everyone's original expectations, and proved that what had once been a pretty standard and uninventive death metal combo was slowly becoming a true contender in the scene." In a retrospective review, Richard Street-Jammer of Invisible Oranges called the album "the last record before they became legends" and "a fetish for crummy metalcore."

Track listing

The digipak reissue released in 2003 includes three additional live tracks from the 1993 live-in-studio session for MTV Europe:

Credits

Band members
Tomas Lindberg – vocals
Anders Björler – guitar
Jonas Björler – bass
Adrian Erlandsson – drums
Martin Larsson – guitar

Guest members
Peter Andersson – cello on "The Swarm" and "And the World Returned"
Ylva Wahlstedt – violin on "The Swarm" and "And the World Returned"

References

At the Gates albums
1994 albums
Albums recorded at Studio Fredman
Peaceville Records albums
Albums produced by Fredrik Nordström